Rachel Kay Foulger (born November 2, 1929), known professionally as Rachel Ames, is an American film and television actress.

The daughter of actors Byron Foulger and Dorothy Adams, she was raised in Portland, Oregon, and Los Angeles, California. She attended University High School and the University of California, Los Angeles studying drama before signing an acting contract with Paramount Pictures, using the stage name Judith Ames. She made her film debut in the studio's science-fiction film When Worlds Collide (1951), followed by  Ricochet Romance (1954).

She went on to have a prolific career in television, where she became best known for her role as Audrey March Hardy on the soap opera General Hospital, beginning in 1964. Ames's role is the longest-running in the series' history, spanning over 50 years and earning her multiple Emmy Award nominations.

Early life
Ames was born Rachel Kay Foulger on November 2, 1929 in Portland, Oregon, the eldest child of actress (and later college drama instructor) Dorothy Adams and actor Byron Foulger. Her sister, Mary Amanda Foulger, was born on May 16, 1942. Through her father, she is of English descent, the fourth generation of English immigrants from Norfolk, who settled in the Salt Lake City area.

Ames spent her early life in Portland, but relocated to California so her parents could work, performing and teaching at the Pasadena Playhouse. She graduated from University High School and later enrolled at UCLA, where her mother was a professor in the university's drama department.

Career

Early work
Ames debuted professionally in 1949 in Pilgrimage Play, and she joined her parents in acting in One Foot in Heaven at the Pasadena Playhouse in Pasadena, California. She transitioned into film  under the stage name Judith Ames, and was
under contract with Paramount Pictures for three years in the early 1950s; her first feature film was When Worlds Collide (1951), a science-fiction thriller based on the 1933 novel of the same name. The same year, she had appeared in "Toast to Our Brother", a short film documenting fraternity life at UCLA, where she was a student at the time.

She had an uncredited role in the film noir The Turning Point (1952), followed by a minor part in the Western Arrowhead (1953) with Charlton Heston. The following year, she had a supporting role in the Western comedy Ricochet Romance (1954). In her only regular role on primetime television, Ames played Policewoman Sandy McAllister on The Lineup in that program's final season during 1959. Ames also had dozens of other guest-starring appearances in television, on series such as The Life and Legend of Wyatt Earp, The Virginian, Ironside, Wagon Train, Trackdown, Ben Casey, Perry Mason, Alfred Hitchcock Presents, and six different appearances on Science Fiction Theater. In "The Jodie Tyler Story" episode of the series Whispering Smith, she played the title role, billed as Rachel Foulger. Her mother, Dorothy Adams, was in the same episode, though they had no scenes together.  She appeared in a lead role in the 1960 Western Gunfighters of Abilene, opposite Buster Crabbe and Barton MacLane.

General Hospital
On February 23, 1964, Ames debuted on ABC's daytime serial, General Hospital, playing Audrey Hardy, R.N. Her tenure in the part is the longest-running role in the network's history, spanning five decades. She also played Audrey Hardy on the General Hospital spin-off series Port Charles in the late 1990s. Her contract was not renewed for General Hospital in 2003, but she still appeared as a recurring character from 2003 until 2007, and made a brief appearance in 2009. On February 13, 2013,  Genie Francis (Laura Spencer) announced on Katie that Ames returned to the show on March 29, 2013. She reprised the role again for one episode on October 30, 2015.

Ames has been nominated three times for a Daytime Emmy Award as Outstanding Actress in a Daytime Drama for her role on General Hospital. In 2004, Ames was honored with a Lifetime Achievement Award at the 31st Daytime Emmy Awards ceremony at Radio City Music Hall in New York City. In 1997, she appeared on ABC's special two-hour primetime preview of new daytime series Port Charles, a spin-off of the long-running, Emmy-winning hit General Hospital. Ames played her signature role of Audrey Hardy.

Later career
In 2007, Ames retired from General Hospital after 43 years. On October 1, 2009,  she was announced to be reappearing as Audrey in mid-October after a two-year absence from the show. She reprised Audrey again in April 2013, to coincide with General Hospitals 50th anniversary and again on October 30, 2015.

Personal life
Ames married Jack Genung on January 31, 1952, in Los Angeles. Her second husband, Canadian-born actor Barry Cahill, and she had two daughters, Christine and Susan, and two grandchildren, Jocelyn and Marc (one source says that Susan was Ames's daughter by her first marriage). Cahill died in April 2012, after 42 years of marriage.

Filmography

Film

Television

References

Works cited

External links
 
 
 
 Rachel Ames at the Internet Archive

1929 births
Living people
Actresses from Portland, Oregon
American people of English descent
American soap opera actresses
American television actresses
Daytime Emmy Award winners
20th-century American actresses
21st-century American actresses
Paramount Pictures contract players
University High School (Los Angeles) alumni
University of California, Los Angeles alumni